Fayette is a city and the county seat of Fayette County, Alabama, United States. The population was 4,619 at the 2010 census, down from 4,922 at the 2000 census.

History
Originally known as "La Fayette", it incorporated on January 15, 1821. When Fayette County was created in 1824, the town's name was officially changed to "Fayette Court House", though it was also known as "Fayetteville", which was the name shown on maps and on the U.S. Census in 1880 and 1890. It was officially shortened to "Fayette" in 1898.

In 1928, Victor and Lucy Patterson began manufacturing Golden Eagle Syrup in Fayette. The syrup is still produced locally in a manufacturing facility in downtown Fayette.

Geography
Fayette is located in west-central Fayette County at  (33.692068, -87.832358).

Climate

Demographics

2000 census
At the 2000 census there were 4,922 people, 2,092 households, and 1,303 families living in the city. The racial makeup of the city was 75.34% White, 23.38% Black or African American, 0.12% Native American, 0.28% Asian, 0.30% from other races, and 0.57% from two or more races. One percent of the population was Hispanic or Latino of any race.
Of the 2,092 households 26.9% had children under the age of 18 living with them, 45.2% were married couples living together, 14.2% had a female householder with no husband present, and 37.7% were non-families. 35.5% of households were one person and 19.0% were one person aged 65 or older. The average household size was 2.20 and the average family size was 2.85.

The age distribution was 21.4% under the age of 18, 9.0% from 18 to 24, 24.2% from 25 to 44, 23.9% from 45 to 64, and 21.6% 65 or older. The median age was 42 years. For every 100 females, there were 81.4 males. For every 100 females age 18 and over, there were 75.7 males.

The median household income was $25,714 and the median family income  was $36,589. Males had a median income of $29,857 versus $21,899 for females. The per capita income for the city was $15,553. About 12.5% of families and 18.0% of the population were below the poverty line, including 21.2% of those under age 18 and 22.9% of those age 65 or over.

2010 census
At the 2010 census there were 4,619 people, 1,924 households, and 1,206 families living in the city. The racial makeup of the city was 73.4% White, 24.3% Black or African American, 0.3% Native American, 0.3% Asian, 0.6% from other races, and 1.2% from two or more races. 1.4% of the population was Hispanic or Latino of any race.
Of the 1,924 households 26.5% had children under the age of 18 living with them, 40.8% were married couples living together, 18.2% had a female householder with no husband present, and 37.3% were non-families. 32.8% of households were one person and 14.0% were one person aged 65 or older. The average household size was 2.27 and the average family size was 2.88.

The age distribution was 22.9% under the age of 18, 9.6% from 18 to 24, 23.0% from 25 to 44, 25.6% from 45 to 64, and 18.9% 65 or older. The median age was 40.2 years. For every 100 females, there were 88.6 males. For every 100 females age 18 and over, there were 88.6 males.

The median household income was $31,705 and the median family income  was $41,905. Males had a median income of $34,271 versus $27,500 for females. The per capita income for the city was $16,602. About 15.4% of families and 20.4% of the population were below the poverty line, including 23.2% of those under age 18 and 15.9% of those age 65 or over.

2020 census

As of the 2020 United States census, there were 4,285 people, 1,888 households, and 1,178 families residing in the city.

Notable people
 Mike Davis, Detroit Mercy Titans men's basketball head coach
 Aaron Fultz, former pitcher for the San Francisco Giants.
 Ronnie McCollum, professional basketball player
 Devin Moore, convict who sparked a large controversy over the video game Grand Theft Auto: Vice City, leading to the court case Strickland v. Sony
 Michael Moore, NFL player
 Charly "Carlos" Palmer, American fine artist
 Curt Porter, former offensive guard for the Denver Broncos
 Dexter Roberts, country singer; finished in seventh place on the thirteenth season of American Idol
 Jimmy Lee Sudduth, outsider artist and blues musician
 Lois Wilson, Outsider artist subject of the documentary Treasures from the Rubble

Local media
The Times-Record is the local newspaper.

The local radio stations are WLDX Big Cat and WTXT.

Activities
Fayette Aquatic Center
Boy Scouts of America Troop 45

Government
Fayette is organized in a mayor-council form of city government, with a mayor elected citywide and five council members elected from districts.

Education
Bevill State Community College has a location in Fayette.

Climate
The climate in this area is characterized by hot, humid summers and generally mild to cool winters.  According to the Köppen Climate Classification system, Fayette has a humid subtropical climate, abbreviated "Cfa" on climate maps.

References

External links
City of Fayette official website

Cities in Alabama
Cities in Fayette County, Alabama
County seats in Alabama
1821 establishments in Alabama
Populated places established in 1821